Sergeant Keith Paul Mitchell (now Chief Warrant Officer), CV, MMM, MSM, CD, a Search and Rescue technician with 413 Search and Rescue Squadron in the Canadian Forces, received the Cross of Valour, the highest Canadian award for acts of courage in circumstances of extreme peril, on September 18, 1998, along with Master Corporal Bryan Keith Pierce.

On November 12, 1996, Sergeant Mitchell and Master Corporal Pierce carried out an unprecedented parachute jump at night from a Hercules aircraft into freezing Arctic waters to provide medical aid to a critically ill fisherman on board a Danish fishing trawler located near Resolution Island, Northwest Territories.

With inadequate flare illumination, Sergeant Mitchell and Master Corporal Pierce parachuted towards where a Zodiac boat was supposed to have been launched to pull them from the sea. Extremely strong winds carried the two men away from the vessel and landed them in freezing three-metre waves. Because of the heavy seas and severe icing conditions, they were unable to swim to the trawler. About 15 minutes later, with the men close to hypothermia, the ice-encrusted Zodiac finally reached them. They made it to the trawler, where they immediately treated the ill sailor and saved his life.

References

Year of birth missing (living people)
Living people
Recipients of the Cross of Valour (Canada)